Jacob Tyson (October 8, 1773July 16, 1848) was an American lawyer and politician from New York.

Life
Tyson attended public school in his youth. He studied law, was admitted to the bar, and practiced law. He was Supervisor of the Town of Castleton, Staten Island from 1811 to 1821. He was First Judge of the Richmond County Court from 1822 to 1840.

Tyson was elected as a Crawford Democratic-Republican to the 18th United States Congress, holding office from March 4, 1823, to March 3, 1825. He was a member of the New York State Senate in 1828.

He was buried at the Reformed Protestant Dutch Church Cemetery in Port Richmond, Staten Island.

Sources

The New York Civil List compiled by Franklin Benjamin Hough (pages 71, 127, 146 and 364; Weed, Parsons and Co., 1858)

1773 births
1848 deaths
New York (state) state senators
People from Staten Island
Town supervisors in New York (state)
New York (state) state court judges
Democratic-Republican Party members of the United States House of Representatives from New York (state)